Goran Fiorentini (born 21 November 1981) is a Croatian-Italian former water polo player who competed in the 2004 Summer Olympics. He is the elder brother of Deni Fiorentini and son of Yugoslavia player Branko Jovanović. Like his brother he holds dual Croatian-Italian citizenship.

See also
 Italy men's Olympic water polo team records and statistics
 List of World Aquatics Championships medalists in water polo

References

External links
 

1981 births
Living people
Croatian male water polo players
Italian male water polo players
Olympic water polo players of Italy
Water polo players at the 2004 Summer Olympics
World Aquatics Championships medalists in water polo
Water polo players from Split, Croatia